The Dark Side of the Moon 50th Anniversary is a box set reissue of British progressive rock band Pink Floyd's 1973 album The Dark Side of the Moon. It will be released on 24 March 2023 by Pink Floyd Records. Five digital-only singles have been released to support the set.

Content 
The box set features a 2023 remaster of The Dark Side Of The Moon album by James Guthrie presented on vinyl and CD; a remastered version of The Dark Side of the Moon Live at Wembley 1974 on vinyl and CD; two BDs and a DVD featuring 5.1 surround sound mix (2003), Dolby Atmos mix (2023), and a new stereo mix. Other items featured in the set include a 160-page hardcover book of photographs from the 1973 – 1974 tours by Jill Furmanovsky, Aubrey Powell, Peter Christopherson, and Storm Thorgerson; a 76-page songbook of the original album; two seven-inch singles of "Money"/"Any Colour You Like" and "Time"/"Us and Them"; a replica of a pamphlet and invitation to the album launch event at the London Planetarium on 27 February 1973; and four posters. The hardcover book and the Wembley live album will be sold as standalone editions. This also marks the first time that The Dark Side of the Moon Live at Wembley 1974 has been available on vinyl and as a standalone release. It was previously only available as part of The Dark Side of the Moon Immersion and Experience editions (2011).

Related events 
On 19 January 2023, a video was uploaded to Pink Floyd's YouTube channel, featuring Nick Mason announcing the Dark Side animation competition. In it, professionals and students can create and submit music videos of the tracks on the album. The winner will be selected by Mason, Aubrey Powell, and the British Film Institute.

Similar to the 1973 planetarium showcase, the album will be playing in planetariums, globally, throughout March 2023.

Track listing 
The Dark Side of the Moon (2023 remaster)

All lyrics are written by Roger Waters. Vocal composition on "The Great Gig in the Sky" by Clare Torry

The Dark Side of the Moon Live at Wembley 1974

Running times are for the CD and digital versions. The LP version has shorter versions of "The Great Gig in The Sky", "Money", "Any Colour You Like", and "Eclipse".

Personnel 
The Dark Side of the Moon

Pink Floyd
 David Gilmour – vocals, guitars, EMS Synthi AKS
 Nick Mason – drums, percussion, tape effects
 Roger Waters – bass guitar, vocals, VCS 3, tape effects
 Richard Wright – organ (Hammond and Farfisa), piano, electric piano (Wurlitzer and Rhodes), VCS 3, Synthi AKS, vocals

Additional musicians
 Dick Parry – saxophone on "Us and Them" and "Money"
 Clare Torry – vocals on "The Great Gig in the Sky"
 Doris Troy – backing vocals
 Lesley Duncan – backing vocals
 Liza Strike – backing vocals
 Barry St. John – backing vocals

Production
 Alan Parsons – engineering
 Peter James – assistant
 Chris Thomas – mix supervisor

Design
 Hipgnosis – sleeve design, photography
 George Hardie – sleeve art, stickers art

The Dark Side of the Moon Live at Wembley 1974

Pink Floyd

 David Gilmour – guitars, vocals, Hammond organ on "The Great Gig in the Sky"
 Roger Waters – bass, vocals
 Richard Wright – keyboards, vocals, Azimuth Co-ordinator
 Nick Mason – drums, percussion

with

 Dick Parry – saxophones
 The Blackberries – backing vocals, lead vocals on "The Great Gig in the Sky"
 Vanetta Fields
 Carlena Williams

Notes

References 

2023 compilation albums
Reissue albums
Pink Floyd compilation albums
Pink Floyd albums